Frederick Jagel (June 10, 1897, Brooklyn, New York – July 5, 1982, San Francisco, California) was an American tenor, primarily active at the Metropolitan Opera in the 1930s and 1940s.

Life and career

Jagel studied voice in New York City and Milan. He debuted as Rodolfo in La bohème in Livorno, in 1924. He sang throughout Italy under the name of Federico Jaghelli. After his return to America, he made his debut at the Metropolitan Opera on November 8, 1927, as Radames in Aida. In 23 seasons with the Met, he sang 217 performances in 34 roles, primarily in the Italian and French repertories. He can be heard in recordings of many Metropolitan Opera radio broadcasts, notably as Pollione in Norma opposite Zinka Milanov, as Don Alvaro in La forza del destino opposite Lawrence Tibbett under Bruno Walter in 1943, and as Edgardo in Lucia di Lammermoor opposite Lily Pons.

Jagel also appeared in San Francisco, Chicago and Buenos Aires before retiring in 1950. He taught singing in New York after his retirement. Among his pupils were tenors Augusto Paglialunga, David Romano, Robert Moulson and John Stewart, as well as bass-baritone Justino Diaz.  He also served as Chairman of the Voice Department at the New England Conservatory of Music in Boston.

Sources 
 D. Hamilton (ed.),The Metropolitan Opera Encyclopedia: A Complete Guide to the World of Opera (New York: Simon and Schuster, 1987).

References 

1897 births
1982 deaths
American operatic tenors
Voice teachers
Singers from New York City
Musicians from Brooklyn
New England Conservatory faculty
20th-century American male opera singers
Classical musicians from New York (state)